Soviet submarine K-1 was a K-class submarine of the Soviet Navy during World War II.
K-1 was the leading boat of the class. At first located in Baltic, it was relocated to the Northern Fleet prior to the war.
  was the commander of the boat: he requested to be demoted just to lead the submarine into battle. Since March 1943 he was promoted and transferred to the staff of the Northern Fleet, escaping death because the submarine was lost in action a few months later.

Loss 
The submarine departed base on 5 September 1943 and was never heard or seen again, being lost due to unknown causes.

Ship service 
Before the sinking, K-1 scored successes as a minelayer-submarine. On 11 August 1942, K-1 was damaged by a mine, but managed to make port on 14 August.

References 

1938 ships
Ships built in the Soviet Union
Soviet K-class submarines
World War II submarines of the Soviet Union
Maritime incidents in September 1943
Lost submarines of the Soviet Union